Ekkaluck Thongkit (born August 27, 1983), simply known as Ekk, is a Thai retired professional footballer who plays as a left back or centre back.

Club career
In 2018 he played with the local Buriram United on loan.

Honours

Club
Chiangmai
 Regional League Northern Division: 2010

References

External links
 Profile at Goal
 https://us.soccerway.com/players/eakarak-thonghkit/287370/

Living people
1983 births
Ekkaluck Thongkit
Ekkaluck Thongkit
Association football fullbacks
Ekkaluck Thongkit
Hoang Anh Gia Lai FC players
Ekkaluck Thongkit
Ekkaluck Thongkit
Ekkaluck Thongkit
V.League 1 players
Ekkaluck Thongkit
Thai expatriate footballers
Thai expatriate sportspeople in Vietnam
Expatriate footballers in Vietnam